Holly Elementary School  can mean:

 Holly Elementary School (Delta, British Columbia)
 Holly Elementary School (Surrey, British Columbia)